Magnocellular may refer to: 
 Magnocellular cell, part of visual system
 Magnocellular red nucleus
 Magnocellular neurosecretory cell
 Magnocellular pathway
 Magnocellular theory of dyslexia